Bukhansan, or Bukhan Mountain, is a mountain on the northern periphery of Seoul, South Korea. There are three major peaks, Baegundae , Insubong , Mangyeongdae . Because of its height and the fact that it borders a considerable portion of the city, Bukhansan is a major landmark visible from most city districts. The name "Bukhansan" means "mountain north of Han River",  referring to the fact that it is the northern border of the city. During the Joseon era, the peaks marked the extreme northern boundary of Seoul.

Bukhansan is the highest mountain within Seoul city boundaries. Apart from Bukhansan, there are seven other mountains including Dobongsan and Suraksan that are over 600 meters high within the city.

Popular throughout the year, Bukhansan, and Bukhansan National Park, which was formed in 1983, are renowned for birdwatching, hiking and rockclimbing. Bukhansan attracts a large number of hikers; around 5 million per year.

Name 
Since 2002 there has been a movement to revert the name of Bukhansan to Samgaksan. For many years up until now, the three main peaks of the park have collectively been called "Bukhansan"; however, the original collective name of these three peaks was Samgaksan, meaning "three-horned mountain."  The head of the Gangbuk-gu District Office in Seoul is leading a petition to have the central government change the name back to the original.

Gallery

Films and literature
Daum webtoon manhwa PEAK by author Hong Sun-soo and artist Im Gak-hyuck is a fictional work based on the mountain rescue team working in this mountain.

References

External links
 Best Hiking Mountains in Seoul by Visit Korea, 2012
 Bukhansan National Park (북한산국립공원) by Visit Korea, 2012
 Bukhansan Hiking Club, 2014

See also

Bukhansanseong
List of mountains in Korea
National parks of South Korea

Mountains of South Korea
Geography of Seoul
Mountains of Gyeonggi Province